The Folk Art Center is a museum of Appalachian arts and crafts located at milepost 382 on the Blue Ridge Parkway near Asheville, North Carolina. It also houses offices for three separate Parkway partners: the Southern Highland Craft Guild, the National Park Service, and Eastern National (known as EN).

The Center, a cooperative effort between the Southern Highland Craft Guild, the National Park Service, and the Appalachian Regional Commission, features many one-of-a-kind handmade crafts and is the most popular attraction on the Parkway, seeing a quarter of a million visitors per year.

Opened to the public at its current location in 1980, the Center contains three galleries, a library, and an auditorium, and also houses the Eastern National bookstore and information center. Admission is free. One of the Center's main attractions is the Guild's century-old Allanstand Craft Shop, changing exhibitions in galleries from its permanent collection of 3,500 pieces of craft objects dating back to the turn of the 20th century. The Center also features an exhibition of traditional and contemporary southern Appalachian crafts.

History 

Frances Goodrich, a Yale graduate, moved to the Asheville, North Carolina area in 1890 to do missionary work for the local Presbyterian Church. She found a few women who were still weaving traditional coverlets in wool and cotton. Goodrich was then inspired with the idea of a cottage industry that would assist mountain families. She founded Allanstand Cottage Industries in 1897 in Madison County, North Carolina. This ultimately became Allanstand Craft Shop. She then moved the business to downtown Asheville in 1908 and from her College Street headquarters she worked with other leaders of the southern Arts and Crafts movement.

In 1928 the idea of the Southern Highland Craft Guild was formed. Chartered in 1930, it would grow to become one of the strongest craft organizations in the country. Second in age only to the Boston Society of Arts and Crafts, the Guild now represents over 1000 craftspeople in 293 counties of 9 southeastern states. The Guild has partnered with the National Park Service for more than fifty years and moved their headquarters permanently to the Asheville location in 1980.

References

External links

Museums in Asheville, North Carolina
Arts centers in North Carolina
Southern art
Folk art museums and galleries in North Carolina
Contemporary crafts museums in the United States
Art museums established in 1980
1980 establishments in North Carolina
National Park Service museums